Scuderia means stable (noun) in the Italian language. It has entered English usage mainly through professional auto racing, in which many Italian teams incorporate the term in their names.

"Scuderia" may refer to:

 Scuderia Ferrari, a current Italian Formula One team
 Scuderia AlphaTauri, a current Italian Formula One team
 Any of a number of other racing teams:
 Scuderia Ambrosiana
 Scuderia Bizzarrini
 Scuderia Centro Sud
 Scuderia Coloni
 Scuderia Colonia
 Scuderia Corsa
 Scuderia Enrico Plate
 Scuderia Famà
 Scuderia Filipinetti
 Scuderia Finotto
 Scuderia Italia
 Scuderia Lavaggi
 Scuderia Milano
 Scuderia Playteam
 Scuderia Serenissima
 Scuderia Toro Rosso
 Scuderia Vittoria
 Scuderia Volpini
 A version of the Ferrari F430
 Scuderia, a streamliner dragster
 Scuderia Cameron Glickenhaus SCG 003, an American sportscar

See also

 Ecurie (disambiguation), French equivalent word